is a female Japanese singer signed to the record label Lantis. She began her career in 2007 and since then has primarily sung songs that were used for theme music in anime. She released her debut album Reflection on July 2, 2008. Her second album Eternalize. was released on June 9, 2010.

Career

2007–2010
Aira Yūki debuted with the release of her first single on April 25, 2007, "Colorless Wind" as the opening theme for the anime Sola. The single went on to enter the Oricon charts eleven times with a peak ranking at 44th place. Her second single was released on August 8, 2007 with the title track,  being the second opening theme for the anime Idolmaster Xenoglossia. The single charted four times with a peak ranking at number 49. Yūki released her third single  on February 6, 2008 as the ending theme of True Tears. Like her second single, "Sekai no Namida" charted four times on the Oricon chart with the peak ranking at number 48. On July 2, 2008, she released her first album, Reflection. The album only entered the chart once, ranking at number 148.

There were no further releases from her until April 22, 2009 with her fourth single, "Blue sky, True Sky" being the first ending theme of the anime adaptation, Tears to Tiara. The single charted twice with a peak position at number 75. Yūki later joined 9 other female artistes from Lantis to perform at the Lantis Presents: twilight listening party vol.6 on July 25, 2009. "Weeping Alone", the second ending theme for Tears to Tiara was released on August 26, 2009. It charted once with the ranking at the 135th place. She released another single, "Dominant Space", on February 10, 2010 before releasing her second album. The single's title track was used as the second ending theme for the anime adaptation of Tatakau Shisho: The Book of Bantorra. The single only entered the Oricon charts once with a peak ranking at number 193. Her second album, Eternalize, was released on June 9, 2010. The album reached number 169.

Yūki released her seventh single  on July 21, 2010. The title track was used as the first opening theme for the anime adaptation, The Legend of the Legendary Heroes. The single entered the Oricon charts five times and reached number 64. The single was an Oricon "Pick" on their 2010 Anime Theme Songs/Summer editorial. She also performed live at the first run of Lantis' "Rock'N Lan Carnival" together with Sayaka Sasaki, Yōsei Teikoku and Hironobu Kageyama. Yūki released her eighth single, on October 27, 2010. The title track was the theme song for the OVA Armored Trooper Votoms Case;Irvine.

2011–present
As of February 2011, Yūki is currently involved in a unit called FairyStory with Yuuka Nanri. The unit already announced an album that was slated to be released in spring 2011. The unit were scheduled to perform at the Chiba TV Anime Carnival on April 3, 2011. Due to the 2011 Tōhoku earthquake and tsunami, the event and her appearance with Yuuka Nanri as FairyStory at the Chiba TV Anime Carnival has been suspended. To aid victims, Yūki has also appeared in a charity event,  to raise funds for the victims of the disaster. She has been scheduled to appear at the charity live,  that would raise funds to be sent to the education board of the elementary schools in Miyagi Prefecture, Iwate Prefecture, Aomori Prefecture and Fukushima Prefecture as well as elementary schools in Niigata Prefecture, Yamagata Prefecture and Gunma Prefecture.

She performed the ending theme of the first two episodes of Space Battleship Yamato 2199 titled, . On the July 17, 2012 broadcast of NozaP・Matsunaga Maho no Live Dog!, she announced her previous work as FictionJunction Asuka, who provided the vocals for "Everlasting Song", an insert song used in the anime Elemental Gelade. Prior to her debut as Aira Yūki, she was signed on to Zazzy, one of Being's independent label. At the end of 2007, her songs, "Sweet Memories" and "It's Too Late" were picked as the best songs for the Jazz category for both Japanese and Western songs. Under Asuka Katō, she had released seven singles and one album.

Her ninth single,  is one of the two ending themes for the second season of Horizon in the Middle of Nowhere, and was released on August 8, 2012. Yūki's third album For My Dear... was released on November 21, 2012. In July 2013, it was announced that she would perform the insert song and ending theme of Mobile Suit Gundam Age: Memory of Eden called . The song was later released on iTunes on July 26. Yūki also performed the ending theme of the anime adaption of BlazBlue called "Reincarnation Blue". Yūki will be performing the ending theme of the 2014 anime television series Broken Blade. The song is titled  and like "Reincarnation Blue", she wrote the lyrics for the song as well.

Discography

Singles
"Colorless Wind", released April 25, 2007
, released August 8, 2007
, released February 6, 2008
"Blue sky, True sky", released April 22, 2009
"Weeping Alone", released August 26, 2009
"Dominant Space", released February 10, 2010
, released July 21, 2010
, released on October 27, 2010
, released on August 8, 2012
"Reincarnation Blue", released on November 27, 2013
, released on May 28, 2014
, released on March 1, 2017
, released on November 22, 2017

Albums
Reflection, released July 2, 2008
Eternalize., released on June 9, 2010
For My Dear..., released on November 21, 2012

Digital-only releases
, released July 27, 2013

Compilations
Oratorio, released August 8, 2007
Metamorphoses, released March 12, 2008
Tears for truth: True Tears Image Song Collection, released April 16, 2008
Shina Dark: Kuroki Tsuki no Ō to Sōheki no Himegimi Vocal Album, released November 26, 2008
Brilliant World, released January 7, 2009
Tears to Tiara Prologue Sound Track "origo cunctarum rerum", released March 4, 2009
Sora o Miageru Shōjo no Hitomi ni Utsuru Sekai Inspired Album, released March 25, 2009
Gundam Tribute from Lantis, released December 9, 2009
Densetsu no Yūsha no Densetsu no Radio Omatome'ban 1, released September 22, 2010
Mojūtsukai to Ōji-sama Character Song Album, released October 20, 2010
Aijō Kakyoku, released October 27, 2010
Fortissimo Songs, released October 27, 2010
Mojūtsukai to Ōji-sama & Mojūtsukai to Ōji-sama: Snow Bride Shudai Kashū, released February 23, 2011
Yunosagi Relations, released June 8, 2011
Memories: The Last Leaf, released on November 23, 2011
Hoshi ga Towa o Terashiteiru/Utsukushii Hoshi o Shiru Mono yo, released on June 27, 2012

Appearances

Radio
, Nippon Cultural Broadcast's Chou!A+G since October 2010 Co-hosted with Yuuka Nanri. The radio show ended on April 2, 2011 with a total of 26 episodes.
Tokyo→Niigata Music Convoy, since October 2011 on every Thursday. The radio show ended on March 28, 2013.
Aira to Chika no Okinimesu mama, since April 6, 2013 on every Saturday.

TV animation
Toaru Majutsu no Index II – Amakusa Girl (episode 14)

GamesAtelier Meruru: Alchemist of Arland 3 – Hom

Drama CDsAnikoi: anime mitaina koi shitai – Female studentVomic – Katekyō Hitman Reborn! – Adelheid SuzukiStrobe Edge – Tamaki

MiscellaneousSister Quest II – SereiaSengoku Otome 2 – Saito MurasameSengoku Otome 3'' – Hoozuki

References

External links
Aira Yūki at Lantis 
Interview with Aira Yūki for Lantis Festival 
  Aira Yūki profile at Oricon 

1981 births
Living people
Anime musicians
Lantis (company) artists
21st-century Japanese singers
21st-century Japanese women singers